Konoglyphus is a genus of mites in the family Acaridae.

Species
 Konoglyphus mexicanus Delfinado & Baker, 1974

References

Acaridae